Rolf Blatter (born 18 February 1951) is a former Grand Prix motorcycle road racer from Switzerland. His most successful year was in 1979 when he finished in second place in the 50cc world championship.

References 

Swiss motorcycle racers
50cc World Championship riders
125cc World Championship riders
1951 births
Living people